Pinion may refer to a number of moths mostly in the family Noctuidae:

 Brown-spot pinion, Agrochola litura
 Lesser spotted pinion, Cosmia affinis
 Lunar-spotted pinion, Cosmia pyralina
 Pale pinion, Lithophane socia
 Pretty pinion, Perizoma blandiata (family Geometridae)
 Tawny pinion, Lithophane semibrunnea
 White-spotted pinion, Cosmia diffinis

See also
Pinion (disambiguation)

Insect common names